Aphelinus thomsoni is a parasitoid wasp that parasitizes the sycamore aphid, Drepanosiphum platanoidis.

References

Aphelinidae
Insects described in 1976